Freel is a surname. Notable people with the surname include:

Aleta Freel (1907–1935), American stage actress
Edward J. Freel, American politician
Ryan Freel (1976–2012), American baseball player

See also 
 Friel
 Freels (disambiguation)
 O'Friel